Aminath Nathasha Jaleel (born 15 March 1984) is a Maldivian film actress.

Career
Before pursuing a career in acting, Jaleel became an active TikTok user, which enabled her to showcase her talent as a performer. During the time, she was featured in several advertisements and took part in few acting workshops. At the end of such one workshop, actor Mohamed Munthasir offered her to play one of the main roles in his sitcom web series, Thin Bibee (2019) where the feedback to the series was minimal. However, it was her next release, Ravee Farooq-directed web series Ehenas which "promoted her acting ability". Following the experiences of a long-term domestic and sexually abused male victim and how he faces the societal obstacles of marriage, Jaleel appeared in its second season as Farzana, an empowering single mother. Ifraz Ali from Dho? pleased with her appearance in the film wrote: "In this season, Jaleel's fantastic performance is the only factor that poured petrol on a dying fire".

During the filming of Thin Bibee, Fuad offered her to play a side role in his period drama web television series Gamini, which she accepted hoping it to "pave the path" for her career. The series along with her performance as the wife of island's chief was positively received by the critics where a critics from Dho wrote; "Jaleel has proved that a genuine performance and a strong screen presence can grab the limelight even with minimal dialogues". The same year, she featured in Madhoship Studio's three-part short film Thadhu which narrates the consequences of the outbreak and perception of lockdown and new-normal in Male' City, through the eyes of three people. In the film she played the role of a hardworking frontline doctor working amid the COVID-19 pandemic. She recalled the project as "frightening experience" with the excessive wear of PPE kit. She was also part of the ensemble cast of Yoosuf Shafeeu's romantic comedy web-series Huvaa Kohfa Bunan, where she played the wife of a man who is a hardcore fan of a local actress. The following year, she starred in Moomin Fuad's crime drama short film Feehaali alongside Ismail Rasheed which got positive reviews from critics.

Filmography

Feature film

Television

Short film

References

External links
 

Living people
People from Malé
21st-century Maldivian actresses
Maldivian film actresses
1984 births